The Welsh Professional Championship was a professional snooker tournament which was open only for Welsh players. It was the first of the four home countries to revive its national professional championship on a regular basis.

History 
The championship was first played in 1922, but it was more than 50 years before Ray Reardon and Doug Mountjoy met, in 1977, for an 'unofficial' Welsh Professional title. Reardon won that encounter 12–8. Even though the event was sponsored by William Hill it wasn't a success and wasn't held again until 1980.

The Ebbw Vale Leisure Centre staged the first official revived championship in 1980 and would host the championship until 1984. The event was sponsored by cider producers H. P. Bulmer, using their Woodpecker brand from 1980 until 1983 and their Strongbow brand in 1984. In 1985 and 1986 the event was held at the Abertillery Leisure Centre. The sponsorship was taken over by BCE for 1985 and Zetters for 1986. The event moved to the Newport Centre in 1985 and remained there until 1991. In the last five years the event had three different sponsors: Matchroom in 1987, Senator Windows between 1988 and 1990, and Regal in 1991.

After the 1991 event Regal withdraw their sponsorship and began to sponsor the Welsh Open – a new ranking event at the same venue, and the Welsh Professional Championship event hasn't been held since then.

Winners

References

 
Snooker non-ranking competitions
Snooker competitions in Wales
Sport in Newport, Wales
Recurring sporting events established in 1980
Recurring events disestablished in 1991
1980 establishments in Wales
1991 disestablishments in Wales
Defunct snooker competitions
Defunct sports competitions in Wales